In British parliamentary practice, the Official Opposition Shadow Cabinet (usually known simply as the shadow cabinet) consists of senior members of His Majesty's Loyal Opposition who scrutinise their corresponding government ministers, develop alternative policies, hold the government to account for its actions and responses, and act as spokespeople for the opposition party in their own specific policy areas. Since May 2010, the Labour Party has been the Official Opposition, and its leadership therefore forms the current shadow cabinet.

Not all opposition frontbenchers are members of the shadow cabinet, which is composed of the most senior opposition members (usually around twenty).

The leader of the opposition, the opposition chief whip and opposition deputy chief whip are the only members of the Official Opposition to be paid for their opposition roles in addition to their salaries as members of Parliament. The leader of the opposition and the opposition chief whip in the House of Lords also receive a salary.

Members

See also
 His Majesty's Most Loyal Opposition (United Kingdom)
 Official Opposition frontbench
 List of British shadow cabinets
 List of shadow holders of the Great Offices of State
 2010 Labour Party (UK) Shadow Cabinet election
 May 2021 British shadow cabinet reshuffle
 November 2021 British shadow cabinet reshuffle
 SNP Frontbench Team
 Liberal Democrat frontbench team
 Cabinet of the United Kingdom
 British Government frontbench

References

External links
His Majesty's Official Opposition – official UK Parliament webpage

Official Opposition (United Kingdom)
Cabinet of the United Kingdom